This is a list of dishes found in Polish cuisine.

Soups
 Barszcz - its strictly vegetarian version is the first course during the Christmas Eve feast, served with uszka (tiny ear-shaped dumplings) with mushroom filling (sauerkraut can be used as well, depending on the family tradition).
 Barszcz biały - sour rye and pork broth with cubed boiled pork, kielbasa, ham, hard boiled egg, and dried breads (rye, pumpernickel)
 Chłodnik - cold soup made of soured milk, young beet leaves, beets, cucumbers and chopped fresh dill
 Czernina - duck blood soup
 Flaki or flaczki - beef or pork guts tripe stew with marjoram The word “Flaki” means guts. In some areas it is made out of a cow's stomach which is cut in stripes. 
 Grochówka - pea and/or lentil soup
 Kapuśniak - cabbage/sauerkraut soup
 Kartoflanka - potato soup
 Kiszczonka - traditional Wielkopolska cuisine, consists of black pudding, flour, milk and spices.
 Krupnik - barley soup with chicken, beef, carrots or vegetable broth
 Kwaśnica - traditional sauerkraut soup, eaten in the south of Poland
 Rosół - chicken noodle soup
 Rumpuć - thick vegetable soup, characteristic of Wielkopolska cuisine
 Zupa borowikowa - boletus mushroom soup
 Zupa buraczkowa - red beetroot soup with potatoes, similar to traditional Barszcz
 Zupa grzybowa/pieczarkowa - mushroom soup made of various species
 Zupa jarzynowa - chicken/vegetable bouillon(bulion) base vegetable soup
 Zupa ogórkowa - soup of Sour, salted cucumbers, often with pork ("dill pickle soup")
 Zupa pomidorowa - tomato soup usually served with pasta or rice
 Zupa szczawiowa - sorrel(szczaw) soup
 Żur - soured rye flour soup with white sausage and/or hard-boiled egg
 Żurek - żur (żurek) with potatoes (ziemniaki), Polish sausage (kielbasa), and Egg (jajko). Depending on the part of Poland (Poland) it came from, it may contain mushrooms (grzyby) as well. This dish is also called żurek starowiejski ("old village"). It is frequently served with sour cream or by itself.

Main course
 Baranina - roasted or grilled mutton
 Bigos - "hunter stew"  of cabbage and a variety of cheap cuts of meat with bone and fat, smoked sausage kiełbasa, wild mushrooms, bay leaf , and sometimes black pepper (traditionally seldon with a tomato base)
 Gołąbki - cabbage leaves stuffed with spiced minced meat and rice or with mushrooms and rice, often in a tomato base
 Golonka - stewed pork knuckle or hock
 Gulasz - stew of meat, noodles and vegetables (especially potato), seasoned with paprika and other spices
 Kaczka z jabłkami - roast duck with apples
 Karkówka - chuck steak, usually roasted 
 Kasza gryczana ze skwarkami - buckwheat groats with chopped, fried lard and onions
 Kaszanka - Polish blood sausage, made of pork blood, liver, lungs and fat with kasza, spiced with onion, pepper and marjoram
 Kołacz or korowaj - traditional sweet breads, also known as yeast cakes, customarily served at weddings
 Kiełbasa - sausage is a staple of Polish cuisine and comes in dozens of varieties, smoked or fresh, made with pork, beef, turkey, lamb, or veal with every region having its own specialty
 Kiszka ziemniaczana - type of roasted sausage made of minced potatoes
 Klopsiki - or ’’pulpety’’, meatballs, often with tomato sauce
 Kotlet mielony - minced meat cutlet with eggs, bread crumbs, garlic, and salt and pepper rolled into a ball and fried with onions and butter
 Kotlet schabowy - pork breaded cutlet; made of pork tenderloin (with the bone or without), or of pork chop. Kotlet z piersi Kurczaka is a Polish variety of chicken cutlet coated with breadcrumbs. Kotlet z Indyka is a turkey cutlet coated with breadcrumbs, served with boiled potatoes and cabbage stew.
 Kurczak pieczony po wiejsku - Polish village style roasted chicken with onion, garlic and smoked bacon
 Łosoś - salmon, often baked or boiled in a dill sauce
 Pampuchy - type of pączek from yeast dough cooked on steam
 Pasztecik szczeciński - deep-fried yeast dough stuffed with meat or vegetarian filling, served in specialized bars as a fast food, different from Polish home-cuisine dishes, which also are called "pasztecik"
 Pieczeń cielęca - roast veal, marinated in an aromatic marinade
 Pieczeń wieprzowa z winem - pork roast with wine
 Pieczeń z mięsa mielonego - ground meat roast 
 Pierogi - dumplings, usually filled with sauerkraut and/or mushrooms, meat, potato and/or savory cheese, sweet curd cheese with a touch of vanilla, or blueberries or other fruits, such as cherries or strawberries, and sometimes even apples—optionally topped with sour cream and/or sugar for the sweet versions.
 Placki ziemniaczane (placki kartoflane) - potato pancakes usually served with sour cream
 Polędwiczki wołowe - beef sirloin, often with rare mushroom sauce
 Pyzy - potato dumplings served by themselves or stuffed with minced meat or cottage cheese
 Rolada z kurczakiem i pieczarkami - roulade of chicken and mushrooms
 Rolada z mięsa mielonego z pieczarkami - ground meat roulade stuffed with mushrooms
 Ryba smażona - fried, breaded fish fillet
 Schab faszerowany - stuffed pork loin
 Wołowina pieczona - roast beef
 "Zapiekanka" - short baguette, cut in two slices, topped with tomato sauce, briefly fried mushrooms and onion, topped with grated cheese and briefly roasted, served hot with ketchup or/and mayonnaise topping, sold as a take away dish (fast food)
 Zrazy - twisted shape thin slices of chopped beef, which is flavored with salt and pepper and stuffed with vegetables, mushrooms, eggs, and potato
 Zrazy zawijane - beef rolls stuffed with bacon, pickle and onion
 Żeberka wędzone - smoked, roasted or grilled ribs

Side dishes
Ćwikła z chrzanem - grated or finely chopped beetroot mixed with chrain
Fasolka z migdałami - fresh slender snipped green beans steamed and topped with butter, bread crumbs, and toasted almond slices
Kapusta kiszona - sauerkraut
Kapusta zasmażana - sauerkraut pan-fried with fried onions, cooked pork, whole pepper, and rich spices; a truly hearty side dish
Kapusta z grochem - peas, sauerkraut and spices
Kartofle gotowane -  simple boiled potatoes with parsley or dill
Kasza gryczana - buckwheat groats
Kopytka - hoof-shaped potato dumplings
Mizeria - traditional Polish salad made from thinly sliced cucumbers and sour cream, seasoned with salt, pepper and occasionally sugar
Ogórek kiszony - dill pickle
Ogórek konserwowy - preserved cucumber which is rather sweet and vinegary in taste
Pieczarki marynowane - marinated mushrooms
Sałatka - vegetable salad lettuce, tomato, cucumber or pickled cucumber; it is optional to add very small amount of white vinegar, heavy cream, mayonnaise or other dressings
Sałatka burakowa (buraczki) - finely chopped warm beetroot salad
Sałatka ogórkowa - pickled cucumber, preserved cucumber, chopped red peppers, onions salad
Sałatka warzywna (sałatka jarzynowa) - vegetable salad, a traditional Polish side dish with cooked and finely chopped root vegetables, potato, carrot, parsley root, celery root, combined with chopped pickled or dill cucumbers and hard-boiled eggs in mayonnaise and mustard sauce. Also made with carrots, red paprika, corn, red beans, peas, potatoes, pickled cucumbers, onion, eggs, sausages, mayonnaise, mustard, salt and pepper.
Sałatka wiosenna - spring salad chopped finely, radishes, green onions, pencil-thin asparagus, peas, hard-cooked eggs or cubed yellow cheese, mayonnaise, salt and pepper, sweet paprika for color
Sałatka z boczkiem - wilted lettuce salad is made with romaine or iceberg lettuce, chopped hard-cooked eggs, finely chopped onion, vinegar, bacon cut into 1/2-inch pieces, water, sugar, salt and pepper
Sałatka z kartofli (sałatka ziemniaczana) - potato salad made with red or white potatoes cooked in their jackets, cooled, peeled and cut into 1/4-inch dice, carrots, celery, onion, dill pickles, mayonnaise, sugar, salt and pepper
Śmietana - whipping cream
Surówka - raw sauerkraut, apple, carrot, and onion salad
Surówka z białej kapusty - coleslaw blend of freshly shredded cabbage, carrots, mayonnaise and spices
Surówka z marchewki - carrot salad made with coarsely grated carrots, coarsely grated granny smith apple, lemon juice, vegetable oil, salt, and sugar
Tłuczone ziemniaki - mashed potatoes

Beverages
Beer (piwo) - popular brand names include Żywiec, Tyskie, Warka, Lech, Okocim, Piast, Łomża, Perła, Leżajsk, Żubr
Cider (cydr)
Coffee (kawa)
Garlic Milk ("mleko czosnkowe") - warm milk with honey and garlic mixed in
Herbal tea (herbata ziołowa/herbatka ziołowa)
Kefir - fermented milk beverage, popular as a drink served at breakfast, lunch, and dinner; Poland is the world's second largest producer of kefir
Kompot - clear juice obtained by cooking fruit in a large volume of water, like strawberries, apricots, peaches, apples, rhubarb, gooseberries, or sour cherries
Kvass - a fermented drink made from dark rye bread, sugar, and yeast; traditionally universal, especially among the peasantry, it gradually became less popular throughout the 20th century until making a comeback in the 21st century
Mead (miód pitny)
Mineral water (woda mineralna)
Nalewka - home-made, vodka-based liqueur-style drinks
Soft drink (oranżada)
Tea (herbata)
Vodka - since the 8th century. In the 11th century they were called gorzalka and originally used as medicines. The world's first written mention of the drink and the word "vodka" was in 1405 from Akta Grodzkie, the court documents from the Palatinate of Sandomierz in Poland. It is traditionally drunk with a 50- to 100-milliliter glass (shot glass). Popular brand names include Belvedere, Chopin, Sobieski, Luksusowa, Absolwent, Żubrówka, Wyborowa, Biała Dama, Polonaise, Żołądkowa Gorzka, Starka, Krupnik, Siwucha and Ultimat.
Wine (wino)
Wściekły pies (mad dog) - shot drink made from vodka, raspberry or blackcurrant syrup, and tabasco sauce

Desserts

Budyń - kind of custard pudding (made with a starch instead of egg yolk); usually comes in many different flavors, such as vanilla, chocolate, banana or cherry
Chałka - sweet white wheat bread from Jewish cuisine
Faworki (chrusty) - light fried pastry covered with icing sugar
Kisiel - juicy pudding made with pure fruit juice thickened with starch
Krówki - Polish fudge, soft milk toffee candies
Kutia - small square pasta or wheat with poppy seeds, nuts, raisins and honey; typically served during Christmas in the eastern regions (Białystok)
Makowiec - poppy seed-swirl cake, sometimes with raisins and/or nuts
Mazurek - cake baked in Poland, particularly at Christmas Eve and Easter, but also at other winter holidays
 Naleśniki - crepes which are either folded into triangles or rolled into a tube typical servings include sweetened quark fresh cheese with sour cream and sugar, various fruits topped with bita śmietana (whipped cream) or with bite bialka (whipped egg whites)
Pączek - closed donut filled with rose marmalade or other fruit conserves
Pańska skórka - taffy sold at cemeteries during Zaduszki and at Stare Miasto (Old city) in Warsaw
Pierniki - soft gingerbread shapes iced or filled with marmalade of different fruit flavours and covered with chocolate
Sernik - Sernik (cheesecake) is one of the most popular desserts in Poland; made primarily of twaróg, a type of quark fresh cheese
Szarlotka or jabłecznik - Polish apple cake
Tort - multi-layered sponge cake filled with buttercream or whippedcream, with fruits or nuts, served on special occasions like nameday or birthday
Twaróg - type of fresh cheese/quark

Folk medicine
Herbata góralska (Goral tea") or herbata z prądem ("Tea with electricity") - tea with alcohol
Syrop z cebuli ("onion syrup") - cough remedy made of chopped onion and sugar; it is still considered a medicine
Tran - cod liver oil used like a vitamin

Regional cuisine
A list of dishes popular in certain regions of Poland:

Greater Poland
Gzik (gzika) - Quark with sour cream, diced European radishes (Raphanus sativus) and diced green onions or chives. In recent years a variant using garlic instead of radishes has become a restaurant staple.
Kaczka z pyzami i modrą kapustą - roast duck with steam-cooked rolls and red cabbage
 Kiszczonka - black pudding soup
 Kopytka - potato dumplings
 Plendze - potato pancakes served with sugar
 Pyry z gzikiem - boiled, peeled or unpeeled potatoes with gzik and butter
Rogale świętomarcińskie - croissants filled with white poppy seeds, almonds, other nuts and raisins, traditionally eaten on November 11, St. Martin's Day

Lesser Poland
Strudel jabłkowy - apple strudel (cake), identical to the Austrian apfelstrudel

Karkówka - tenderloin, usually roasted 
Kiełbasa - krakowska, podwawelska
 Makowiec - poppy seed cake 
 Miodek turecki - caramelised sugar, traditionally with nuts

 Pischinger chocolate oblaten cake - cake made of layers of wafer and layer
Proziaki - Polish flat soda bread 
Przysmak piwny - beef jerky

Goral Lands
Bryjka
Bryndza - cheese
Bundz - cheese
Czosnianka - soup
Gołka - cheese
Kwaśnica - sauerkraut and potato soup
Oscypek - hard, salty cheese from non-pasteurized sheep milk which is smoked over a fire; sometimes served sliced and fried with cranberries
Śliwowica łącka - (read: [shlee-voh-veetsa won-tskah]) strong plum brandy (70% alcohol)
Żentyca - popular drink made of sheep's milk whey

Lubelszczyzna

Biłgoraj pierogi - regional pâté/pie from Biłgoraj Land, based on potatoes, quark and buckwheat groats (kasha) 
Cebularz - Jewish dish wheat flat-cake, topped with onion and poppy-seed
Forszmak - appetizer with salty minced fish and meat
Kaszak - bread roll infilled with Biłgoraj pierogi
Marchwiak - in appearance similar to a Swiss roll, infilled with a carrot filling
Ruthenian pierogi, Pierogi ruskie - most stuffed with twaróg and potato
Pierogi z bobem - pierogi stuffed with broad bean

Masovia
Baba warszawska - yeast cake
Bułka z pieczarkami - a bun filled with a champignon (field mushroom) stew; ersatz hot dogs under communism, when frankfurters were in short supply
Flaczki z pulpetami (po warszawsku) - tripe stew with marjoram and small meat noodles 
Kawior po żydowsku - "Jewish caviar";  chopped calf or poultry liver with garlic and hard boiled egg
Kugiel - found in the town of Ostrołęka, made with potatoes and diced meat
Nalesniki - pancakes filled with sweet white cheese
Pączki - doughnuts with rose marmalade
Pyzy z mięsem - round potato dumplings stuffed with meat
Zrazy wołowe - rolled beef strips in sauce
Zrazy wołowe zawijane - chopped dill cucumbers and onions wrapped in thin strips of beef
Zupa grzybowa po kurpiowsku (z gąsek) - mushroom soup made of Tricholoma equestre (pol. gąska), a large mushroom with a cereal-like flavor

Masuria
Kartacz - see #Podlaskie
Sękacz - pyramid cake, made of many layers

Opole

Ciapkapusta, pańczkraut, pańćkraut - potato, cabbage pureé dish
Biołe kluski - potato dumplings with a small depression in the centre
Śląskie niebo - bacon with kluski and sauce, generally with vegetables

Podlachia

Babka ziemniaczana 
Babka żółtkowa - yolk and yeast cake
Bliny gryczane - buckwheat pancakes
Cebulniaczki 
Cepeliny - big, long potato dumplings stuffed with meat and marjoram
Chleb biebrzański 
Chłodnik - cold soup made of soured milk, young beet leaves, beets, cucumbers and chopped fresh dill 
Grzyby po żmudzku - mushrooms, Samogitian style
Kartacz - big, long potato dumplings stuffed with meat and marjoram
Kawior z bakłażana - "caviar" of eggplant
Kiszka ziemniaczana - potato sausage
Kopytka - potato dumplings with fried onions
Korycinski - cheese 
Kreple z lejka
Kugiel ze skwarkami
Kutia - traditional Christmas dish, made of wheat, poppy seeds, nuts, raisins and honey 
Melszpejz zaparzany z jabłek
Okoń smażony, w zalewie octowej - perch fried in vinegar
Pieczeń wiedźmy
Ruskie pierogi - Ruthenian style pierogi with quark cheese and potato
Sękacz - pyramid cake, made of many layers
Szodo
Tort ziemniaczany - potato cake
Żeberka wieprzowe po żmudzku - pork ribs, Samogitian style
Zrazy wołyńskie
Zucielki

Pomerania

Pierniki - soft gingerbread shapes filled with marmalade of different fruit flavours and covered with chocolate
Ruchanki - flat, oval racuszki hot fried on fat
Szpekucha - small dumplings stuffed with lard and fried onion

Świętokrzyskie

Dzionie rakowskie - kaszanka made from pork or beef intestine, visually similar to kaszanka pâté
Fitka kazimierska - traditional soup from Kazimierza County; made from potatoes, vegetables, pork rind from fatback, barley kasza and tomato pureé
Krówka opatowska (Opatów krówka) - milk condensate sweet with a minute vanilla taste; produced since the year 1980
Prazoki - kluski-like dish made from boiled potatoes and steamed flour, served with fatback and onion
Słupiański siekaniec dworski - rouladen dish, sliced into c. 1.5 cm wide pieces; includes gentium and groat kasza

Western Pomerania
Paprykarz szczeciński - paste made by mixing fish paste with rice, onion, tomato concentrate, vegetable oil, salt and a mixture of spices including chilli pepper powder
Pasztecik szczeciński - deep-fried yeast dough stuffed with meat or vegetarian filling, a typical fast food dish of Szczecin

Silesia

Kluski śląskie (Silesian dumplings) - round dumplings served with gravy, made of mashed boiled potatoes, finely grated raw potatoes, an egg, grated onion, wheat flour and potato starch flour
Knysza - bread roll with meat and vegetables
Krupniok - blood sausage made of kasza and animal blood, spiced with marjoram and garlic 
Makiełki, moczka, or makówki - traditional Christmas Eve dessert; its main ingredients are gingerbread extract, nuts and dried fruit, strawberry compote and almonds
Poppy seed pastry - many elaborate recipes are possible; based on finely ground poppy seeds, with raisins, almonds, Candied citrus peels, honey, sugar, pudding flavoured with rum; decorated with fingers of crumbling
Rolada z modrą kapustą (roladen with red cabbage) - best-quality beef-meat roll; stuffed with pickled vegetable, ham, and good amount of seasoning; always served with red cabbage (with fried bacon, fresh onion and allspice); traditionally eaten with kluski śląskie for Sunday dinner
Siemieniotka or siemiotka - very original and rare kind of soup made of hemp seed with boiled kasza, one of the main Christmas Eve meals; requires a lot of hand work to prepare according to tradition
Szałot (Silesian potato salad) - salad made of squares of boiled potatoes, root vegetables, various sausages (sometimes ham), pickled fish (usually herring), boiled eggs, bound with mayonnaise
Wodzionka or brołtzupa (German brot, bread; Polish zupa, soup) - soup with garlic and squares of dried rye bread
Żymła - well-baked bread roll, oval with a division in the middle, topped with poppy seeds, similar to the Austrian keisersemmel
Żymlok - like krupniok, but instead of kasza, there is a bread roll
Tyskie - beer for worker man after szychta in coal mine

Gallery

Beverages

Dairy

Meat and fish

Sweet pastries and cakes

Savoury pastries and bread

Vegetables: salads and pickles

Soups and dumplings

Pancakes

Kasha

See also

 List of Polish desserts

References

External links
Polish meals culinary blog
 
 Polish Culinary Art

Lists of foods by nationality

Dishes